Mangelia costellaria is an extinct species of sea snail, a marine gastropod mollusk in the family Mangeliidae.

Description

Distribution
This extinct marine species was found in Oligocene strata in Belgium; age range : 33.9 to 28.4 Ma

References

 Fossilworks : Mangelia costellaria
 R. Marquet, J. Lenaerts, C. Karnekamp and R. Smith. 2008. The molluscan fauna of the Borgloon Formation in Belgium (Rupelian, Early Oligocene). Palaeontos 12:1-99

External links

costellaria
Gastropods described in 1836